New Survey is an unincorporated community in Pemiscot County, in the U.S. state of Missouri.

New Survey was laid out in the 1910s in accordance with a new county survey, hence the name.

References

Unincorporated communities in Pemiscot County, Missouri
Unincorporated communities in Missouri